Paul Brunton is the pen name of Raphael Hurst (21 October 1898 – 27 July 1981), a British author of spiritual books. He is best known as one of the early popularizers of Neo-Hindu spiritualism in western esotericism, notably via his bestselling A Search in Secret India (1934) which has been translated into over 20 languages.

Brunton was a proponent of a doctrine of "Mentalism", or Oriental Mentalism to distinguish it from subjective idealism of the western tradition. Brunton expounds his doctrine of Mentalism in The Hidden Teaching Beyond Yoga (1941, new ed. 2015 North Atlantic Books), The Wisdom of the Overself (1943, new ed. 2015 North Atlantic Books) and in the posthumous publication of The Notebooks of Paul Brunton in 16 volumes (Larson Publications, 1984–88).

Biography
Hurst was born in London in 1898.
He served in a tank division during the First World War, and later devoted himself to mysticism and came into contact with Theosophists.
He married Karen Augusta Tuttrup in 1921, with whom he had a son, Kenneth Thurston Hurst (b. 1923).
After his wife had an affair with his friend Leonard Gill, the marriage ended in divorce in 1926, but Hurst remained on friendly terms with his ex-wife and with Gill.
He was a bookseller and journalist, and wrote under various pseudonyms, including Raphael Meriden and Raphael Delmonte.
Being partner of an occult bookshop, The Atlantis Bookshop, in Bloomsbury, Hurst came into contact with both the literary and occult British intelligentsia of the 1920s.

In 1930, Hurst embarked on a voyage to India, which brought him into contact with Meher Baba, Vishuddhananda Paramahansa, Paramacharya of Kancheepuram and Ramana Maharshi. At the Paramacharya's insistence, he met Bhagavan Ramana Maharshi, which led to a turn of events culminating in revealing Ramana to the western world.
Hurst's first visit to Sri Ramana's ashram took place in 1931. During this visit, Hurst was accompanied by a Buddhist bhikshu, formerly a military officer but meanwhile known as Swami Prajnananda, the founder of the English ashram in Rangoon.
Hurst asked several questions, including "What is the way to God-realization?" and Maharshi said: "Vichara, asking yourself the 'Who am I?' enquiry into the nature of your Self."

Paul Brunton was the pseudonym under which A Search in Secret India was published in 1934. The book became a bestseller, and Hurst afterwards stuck to publishing under this name.

Brunton has been credited with introducing Ramana Maharshi to the West through his books A Search in Secret India and The Secret Path.

One day—sitting with Ramana Maharshi—Brunton had an experience which Steve Taylor names "an experience of genuine enlightenment which changed him forever". Brunton describes it in the following way:

Brunton was in India during World War II, as a guest of the Maharaja of Mysore,  Krishna Raja Wadiyar IV. He dedicated his book The Quest of the Overself to the Maharaja and when the Maharaja died in 1940, he was present at his funeral.

Brunton commented on Mahatma Gandhi and the Indian independence movement:

In the 1940s and 1950s, Brunton occasionally stayed as a guest, for a few weeks at a time, about six months total, with the parents of controversial American author and former psychoanalyst Jeffrey Masson. In 1956, Brunton decided that a third world war was imminent and the Massons moved to Montevideo, since this location was considered safe. From Uruguay, Masson went with Brunton's encouragement to study Sanskrit at Harvard. Brunton himself did not move to South America, instead spending some time living in New Zealand. In 1993, Masson wrote a critical account of Brunton titled My Father's Guru: A Journey Through Spirituality and Disillusion.

In the 1950s, Brunton retired from publishing books and devoted himself to writing essays and notes.  Upon his death in 1981 in Vevey, Switzerland, it was noted that in the period since the last published book in 1952, he had rendered about 20,000 pages of philosophical writing.

A longtime friend of Brunton's, philosopher Anthony Damiani, founded Wisdom's Goldenrod Center for Philosophic Studies in 1972.  Swedish publisher Robert Larson helped to start Larson Publications (USA)  which completed the publication of the 16-volume set of The Notebooks of Paul Brunton in 1988. Brunton's son Kenneth Hurst helped form the Paul Brunton Philosophic Foundation which continues to publish and archive Paul Brunton's literary legacy.

Bibliography

Books
Are You Upward Bound with William G. Fern (1931)
A Search in Secret India (1934)
The Secret Path (1935)
A Search in Secret Egypt (1936)
A Message from Arunachala (1936)
A Hermit in the Himalayas (1936)
The Quest of the Overself (1937)
Indian Philosophy and Modern Culture (1939)
The Inner Reality (1939) [published in the US as Discover Yourself, same year]
The Hidden Teaching Beyond Yoga (1941)
Wisdom of the Overself (1943)
Spiritual Crisis of Man (1952)

Miscellaneous
Brunton, Paul. 1975. "A Living Sage of South India"  in The Sage of Kanchi, New Delhi: Arnold-Heinemann, New Delhi. ed by T.M.P. Mahadevan, chapter 2
Brunton, Paul. 1959, 1987. Introduction to  Fundamentals of Yoga, by Rammurti S. Mishra, M.D. New York; Harmony Books
Brunton, Paul. 1937. "Western Thought and Eastern Culture", article, The Cornhill Magazine
Brunton, Paul. 1951. Introduction to Wood, Ernest Practical Yoga London: Rider
Plus articles in Success Magazine, Occult Review, and The Aryan Path

Posthumously published texts
Essays on the Quest (1984)
Essential Readings
Conscious Immortality 
Notebooks of Paul Brunton (1984–88)

References

Kenneth Thurston Hurst, Paul Brunton: A Personal View, 1989, 
 Jeffrey Moussaieff Masson, My Father's Guru: A Journey Through Spirituality and Disillusion, Addison-Wesley (1993), (new edition 2003 by Ballantine/Random House)
 Annie Cahn Fung, Paul Brunton A Bridge Between India and the West. A doctoral thesis presented to the Department of Religious Anthropology Universite de Paris IV Sorbonne, 1992, online text, published by wisdomsgoldenrod
J. Glenn Friesen: Studies Related to Paul Brunton, online text

External links
 Paul Brunton Philosophic Foundation
 Paul Brunton Daily Note
 Reflections of Paul Brunton at Nonduality.com
 Paul Brunton at WriteSpirit.net
 The Notebooks of Paul Brunton

1898 births
1981 deaths
British spiritual writers
20th-century mystics
New Age writers
20th-century British philosophers